The men's Association football tournament has been held at every session of the African Games since 1965.  Women's competition was added in 2003.
Since 1991, age limit for men teams is under-23, same as the age limit in football competitions at the Summer Olympics.

Men's tournament

Summaries

Notes

Performances by countries for men

Participating nations
Numbers refer to the final placing of each team at the respective Games.

Women's tournament

Summaries

Performances by countries for women

Participating nations
Numbers refer to the final placing of each team at the respective Games.

Medal table

Overall

Men

Women

See also

External links
 1965–2007 editions (men's) at CAF (archived)
 2003–2007 editions (women's) at CAF (archived)
 African Games at the RSSSF
 Football All Africa Games index at todor66.com 

 
All
All-Africa Games